Sławomira Szpek (born March 29, 1974 in Gdynia) is a Polish sport shooter. She won a silver medal for the 25 m pistol (SP) at the third meet of the 2008 ISSF World Cup in Munich, Germany, with a score of 785.7 points.

At age thirty-four, Szpek made her official debut for the 2008 Summer Olympics in Beijing, where she competed in two pistol shooting events. She placed thirtieth out of forty-four shooters in the women's 10 m air pistol, with a total score of 378 points. Three days later, Szpek competed for her second event, 25 m pistol, where she was able to shoot 283 targets in the precision stage, and 292 in the rapid fire, for a total score of 575 points, finishing only in twenty-seventh place.

Sławomira Szpek is the Polish Navy officer (porucznik marynarki).

References

External links
ISSF Profile
NBC 2008 Olympics profile

Polish female sport shooters
Living people
Olympic shooters of Poland
Shooters at the 2008 Summer Olympics
Sportspeople from Gdynia
1974 births